Cyprinella whipplei, the steelcolor shiner, is a freshwater fish species found in North America. It is common throughout Mississippi River basin and in the Black Warrior River system in Alabama.

The maximum age reported in this species was three years. C. whipplei lives in schools on rocky or sandy floors of creeks and small rivers.

The fish was named in honor of Lieut. Amiel Weeks Whipple (1818-1863) the military engineer/surveyor, who led boundary survey team that collected the type specimen.

References

Cyprinella
Taxa named by Charles Frédéric Girard
Fish described in 1856